Hyles hippophaes, the seathorn hawk-moth, is a species of moth in the family Sphingidae. The species was first described by Eugenius Johann Christoph Esper in 1789.

Distribution 
It is found in Afghanistan, Armenia, Azerbaijan, China, France, Georgia, Germany, Greece, Iran, Iraq, Kazakhstan, Kyrgyzstan, Mongolia, Pakistan, Romania, Serbia and Montenegro, Spain, Switzerland, Syria, Tajikistan, Turkey, Turkmenistan, and Uzbekistan.

Description 
The wingspan is 65–80 mm. Subspecies H. h. bienerti is paler and browner than related subspecies. A pale, oblique median line is noticeable on the underside of the forewing. The hindwing patches are more orange than red.

Biology 
Larvae of subspecies H. h. bienerti have been recorded on Elaeagnus angustifolia and Hippophae rhamnoides in China and Tajikistan.

Subspecies
Hyles hippophaes hippophaes
Hyles hippophaes bienerti (Staudinger, 1874) (from Turkey, the Caucasus and southern Russia, east through Iran, Turkmenistan, Uzbekistan, Tajikistan, Afghanistan to Kashmir and north-western India, and north-east through Kyrgyzstan and eastern Kazakhstan to northern China, Mongolia, Lake Baikal and Tuva in Russia)
Hyles hippophaes miatleuskii Eitschberger & Saldaitis, 2000 (Kazakhstan)

References

Sources

External links

Seathorn hawk-moth, UKMoths
Fauna Europaea
Lepiforum e.V.

Hyles (moth)
Moths described in 1793
Moths of Europe
Moths of Asia
Taxa named by Eugenius Johann Christoph Esper
Taxonomy articles created by Polbot